Ronny Someck (born 1951) is an Israeli poet and author, whose works have been translated into many languages.

Biography
Someck was born in Baghdad and came to Israel as a young child. He studied Hebrew literature and philosophy at Tel Aviv University and drawing at the Avni Academy of Art. He has worked with street gangs, and currently teaches literature and  leads creative writing workshops.

He is in the 120th place on the Blue and White list for the 2020 Israeli legislative election.

Literary career
Someck has published 14 volumes of poetry and authored 2 children's book together with his daughter Shirly (The Laughter Button and Monkey Tough, Monkey Bluff), that have been translated into 44 languages.
Selections of his poems have appeared in Arabic translation, French (with the exile Iraqi poet- A.K. El-Janabi), Catalan, Albanian, Italian, Macedonian, Croatian, Yiddish, Nepali, Dutch, Danish, Spanish, Portuguese and English.

He is the recipient of the Prime Minister's Award, Yehuda Amichai Award for Hebrew poetry, The "Wine poem award" in Struga Poetry Evenings, Macedonia, 2005 and Hans Berghhuis prize for poetry 2006 at the Maastricht International Poetry Nights, the Netherlands.

He has recorded three discs with the musician Elliott Sharp: Revenge of the Stuttering Child, Poverty Line, and A Short History of Vodka.

In 1998 he mounted  an exhibition “Nature's Factory, winter 2046” with Beny Efrat at the Israel Museum.

He is a member of the Public Council of the Batsheva Dance Company and the Hebrew-Arabic Theatre.

In 2012 he was awarded the Cross of The Order of The Knights for a Distinguished Service of Poland.

In 2013 he was awarded the knight of the Order of Arts and Letters of France.

In 2016 he was awarded the exemplary man of the "Lions International".

In 2017 he received a college prestige of the Arab Academic College for Education in Israel in Haifa.

Published works
  Hermes" (2022)
  So much god (2020)
 Revenge of the Stuttering Child (2017)
 Horse power (2013)
 Algeria (2009)
 The Milk Underground (2005)
 The Revolution Drummer (2001)
 Rice Paradise (1996)
 Bloody Mary (1994)
 Panther (1989)
 Seven Lines on the Wonder of the Yarkon (1987)
 Asphalt (1984)
 Solo (1980)
 Exile (1976)

For children:
 The Laughter Button with Shirly Someck  (1998)
 Monkey Tough, Monkey Bluff with Shirly Someck (2012)

In Albanian
 The Sign of the Bite (2001, Tirane)
 Prekla e te Qeshurit (2006, Tirane)

In Arabic:
 Jasmine (1994, Israel)
 And the poem is a gangster's girl (1996, Paris)
 "Lion's Milk" (2010 Cairo)
" i love her and let the world burn" (2022, Israel)

In Catalan:
 En paper de vidre (2000, Barcelona)
 Amor Pirata (2006, Barcelona)

In Croatian
 Poems (Special edition on the occasion of Literature Live Festival. 2008, Zagreb)

In English:
 The Fire Stays in Red (2002, USA)
 "The milk underground" (White Pine Press - Cliff Becker Book Prize in Translation 2015 USA)
 "God's Candy Bag" with Yigal Ozeri(Mana Contemporary-Jersey City, USA, 2021)

In French:

 Nes a Bagdad with A.K. El Janabi (1998, Paris)
 Constat de Beaute (Edition PHI, 2008, Luxembourg)
 Bagdad Jerusalem with Salach Al Hamdani(Edition s Bruno Doucey, Paris 2012)
 Le Baiser de la Poesie, 24 Poemes d'amour de Yehuda Amichai et Ronny Someck (edition Levant, Paris 2016)
 "Le piano ardent"(Editions Bruno Doucey, Paris 2017)
 Lettre imaginaires" (Edition Segust, 2021)
 cristal blues"(Edition Segust, 2022)

In Italian
 Il Rosso Catalogo della Parola Tramonto with Fausta Squatriti (NOLA)
 Il Bambino Balbuziente (Mesogea, Sicily 2008) 2002)

In Macedonian
 weat (2005, Skopje)Asphalt Dragons (2011, Skopje)

In NepaliBaghdad, February 1991 Translated into Nepali by Yuyutsu RD Sharma, (Nirala Publications, 2010, New Delhi in collaboration with White Lotus Book Shop, Kathmandu)

In Yiddish
 I am a pajama Iraqi'' (H.Levick Publishing House, Tel Aviv)

In Dutch
 "Blues van de derde zoen"(Azul Press.Maasticht 2010)
 " Mug Shot "(with Hans van de Waarsenburg) Azul Press.Maasticht 2012)

in Danish
 " Solens fine pensel" (Forlagrt Goldberg & Mor. Copenhagen 2010)

In Portuguese
 "Left foot goal"(annablume.brazil 2012)
In German 
 "Nagel" (Azul Press 2012) 
In Spanish
 "El Paraiso del Arroz" (Leviatan 2013)
In Russian
 "The Leopard and the Glass Slipper".tr:Lena (Elena) Baibikov. Knizhnoe obozrenie (ARGO-RISK): Moscow, 2014
In Turkish
 "The Ballad of Alcohol valley". Tr: Muesse Yeniay. (Siiri). Turkey 2014

Translations of his poems have appeared in anthologies and poetry journals in 41 languages.

Books about Ronny Someck
 Yair Mazor :"Poetic acrobat", Goblon Fern Press, USA 2008.
 Gilles Rozier: "Deux Enfants De Bagdad (Salah Al Jamdani & Ronny Someck), Les arenes, France 2015.
Yair Mazor: "A Poet writes the blues" (Henshel Haus U.S.A 2016)
Noa Shakargy, Yigal Shevars, Ketzia Alon (Editors): "The Street's Word Of Honour-Reading Ronny Someck's Poetry "(Israel 2019)

Prizes

 ACUM special Jubilee Prize for a special achievement, 1987.
 Prime Minister's Prize, 1989,2000.
 Afrat Prize,1999.
 Ahi Prize (The Association for the Promotion of Research, Literature and Art, founded in Israel by Jews from Iraq), 1999
 Yehuda Amichai prize for Hebrew poetry (2005)
 "wine poem award" Struga Poetry Evenings, Macedonia, 2005
 Hans Berghhuis prize for poetry 2006.the Maastricht International Poetry Nights. Holand
 Ramat Gan prize for poetry 2010
 He was awarded the exemplary man of the "Lions International" in 2016
 Meir Ariel Prize for Creativity in the Hebrew Language (2019)

Art
Artworks by Ronny Someck or based on his work:
 “The wall of bliss”, The Artist Museum, Lodz, 1993.
 “Jasmine”. Um-El-Fahem Gallery, 1996.
 “A poem of bliss”, Artists-Messengers of peace, Eretz-Israel Museum, 1996.
 “Rosalia”- “Mini-Arutr”, Gubbio, Italy, 1997.
 “The Razor that cut the Metaphoric Face of Poetry”- Five etchings by Yigal Ozeri ensuing five poems by Ronny Someck, Tel-Aviv Museum, Binet Gallery, Israel, Z Gallery New York, 1997.
 Nature's Factory, with Benni Efrat, Israel Museum, 1998.
 " “The Ballad OF alcohol Valley”.Haifa International Installation Triennale. HAIFA MUSEUM OF ART.1999.
 Markers – On Outdoor Banner Event of Artists an Poets for Venice Biennale. 2001, 2003,2005,2007.
 “Il Rosso Catalogo della Parola Tramonto”-Five etchings by Fausta Squatriti ensuing  poems by Ronny Someck. Fallani Best Gallery. Firenze. 2002.
 "Hawadja Bialik"-The Museum of Israeli Art, Ramat Gan.2004.
 "Impermanenza".Centro Studi Maitreya-Venezia.2004
 "And Next to it, in a Similar Frame"-15 photographers relating to the poems of Ronny Someck.College of Design –Haifa-   Canadian Hadassah Wizo.2005
 "Rehal Madrid"- The Museum of Israeli Art, Ramat Gan.2007/
 "Wandering Library 2". Galerie Cargo 21". Paris.2008
 "mono".barbur Gallery.2009
 "Acqua" Artist Book- Markers 7, Scala Mata Gallery, the 53 Venice biennale, 2009 
 "napkin"- The Museum of Israeli Art, Ramat Gan.2010
 "Pointe Shoes". Artist Book. Even Hoshen.2010
 "piyyt, emotion, and thought. Beit avi chai gallery.2012
 "swan Lake"- The Museum of Israeli Art, Ramat Gan.2012
 "Al-Mutanabbi Street start here", Art book in the Center of Book Arts, New York, 2013
 "FEATHER AND LEAD", Photographic correspondence with the poems of Ronny Someck,  A project of the Department of    Photography & Media, The NB Haifa School of Design, Curator: Micha Kirshner ,2013
 "Hall of Fame" - The Museum of Israeli Art, Ramat Gan.2014
"Tow time Chai" - the Beit Avi Chai, Curator: Amichai Chasson, Jerusalem, 2016
'Doom's Path, Winter 2065' by Benni Efrat. The installation 'The last tiger requiem', Petach Tikva Museum of Art (2018)
 'Jacques Brel and Friends', Interpôle ASBL, Rue Locquenghien 12, 1000 Brussels (2018)
 'Talking Heads', The Kibbuzim College of Education Technology & Arts, Tel Aviv (2018)
 'Hang 'em High', Zemack Contemporary Art, Tel Aviv (2018)
 'My Hebrew Hall of Fame', Cymbalista Synagogue and Jewish Heritage Center. Tel Aviv University (2018)
 'Ronny Someck - Hall of Fame´, Maison Blanche, Marseille (2018)
 'More than 1000 words', book fair Mexico city,(2018)
 'Una imagen dice más que mil palabras', Cineteca Nuevo León , Monterrey, Mexico (2019)
 'Tabula Rasa-The Great Notebook Project' Gallery on the Cliff, Netanya 2019 (group exhibition)
 'NOTES' Artists play with music sheets. Rubin Museum, Tel Aviv, 2019 (Group exhibition)
 'Talking Heads',Bar-Ilan University Faculty of Jewish Studies, Ramat Gan (2019) (solo exhibition)
 'C.O.L.D.A.S.S.' , Janco Dada Museum, Ein Hod 2019 (group)
 'Artist Book Fair', Artist Book with Yigal Ozeri, MOMA PS1 New York, USA 2019 (Group)
 Lea G- painting by Lea Goldberg and Ronny Someck, Mishkenot Sha'ananim, Jerusalem , 2020 ,
 Poems in Black Ink Rali Museums Caesarea, Israel (2021)
 Friends in Ink University of Haifa, Israel (2021)

Music
 “Revenge of the Stuttering child” CD With Elliott Sharp, Tzadik Records, New York, 1997
 “Poverty line”, CD with Elliott Sharp. ZuTa Music. Tel-Aviv, 1999
 “A Short History of Vodka”. ZuTa Music-NMC.Tel-Aviv, 2001
 " Drum's Solo". P'gooay Mo'ach feat with Ronny Someck, Zimmer Music, Tel Aviv 2012
 " Sidewalks produce electricity" with Haim Rachmani, Kame'a Music, 2019

References

External links
  http://www.ronnysomeck.com/
 
 The Emperor of Emotions, by Yuyutsu RD Sharma, Himalayan Times, 2004-08-05, Kathmandu
http://israel.poetryinternationalweb.org/piw_cms/cms/cms_module/index.php?obj_id=6347

1951 births
Living people
Writers from Baghdad
Israeli poets
20th-century Iraqi poets
Iraqi Jews
Israeli Jews
Iraqi emigrants to Israel
International Writing Program alumni
21st-century Iraqi poets
Recipients of Prime Minister's Prize for Hebrew Literary Works